Bagdad  is a village in the administrative district of Gmina Wyrzysk, within Piła County, Greater Poland Voivodeship, in west-central Poland. In 2006 the village had a population of 120.

Formerly, before World War II, Bagdad was a farm and belonged to Mieczysław Chłapowski, a Polish landlord and politician. The village currently has a manor house (Gothic Revival architecture style), and a stud farm.

References

Bagdad